Oru Thalai Ragam is a 1980 Indian Tamil-language romantic musical film written by Rajendar and produced by E. M. Ibrahim who is credited for direction. The film stars Shankar and Roopa, with Raveendar, Chandrasekhar, Kailashnath, Kumari Usha and Thyagu in supporting roles. It revolves around a college student falling in love with his classmate who, despite liking him, avoids returning his love.

Oru Thalai Ragam was released on 2 May 1980. The film earned critical acclaim and became a major box office success, running for over a year in theatres. It also won the Cinema Express Award for Best Tamil Film. The film was remade in Telugu as Panchadara Chilaka (1999).

Plot 
Raja is a college student who is popular among the other students. Subhadra, his sincere and quiet classmate, never speaks openly even with her closest friend Lavanya. Subhadra's father had deserted her mother and two daughters, suspecting that she had loved someone before marriage. As a result, people in their locality look down on Subhadra's mother, who supports her children by stitching clothes and is the subject of most gossip sessions. However, Subhadra concentrates only on studies without getting distracted by other issues as advised by her mother, and maintains a safe distance from other college boys.

Subhadra's male classmates Madhu, Kannan and Thambu tease her in class by narrating the rumours about her mother and gossip about her love for Raja. When she gets upset, Raja tries to protect her from Madhu's group many times. Raja and Subhadra develop fondness and miss each other if they do not see even for a day, though they never speak to each other about the good feeling they have for each other. Raja's classmate Moorthy notices Raja's interest in Subhadra. Lavanya also notices the same affinity in Subhadra towards Raja.

One day, when Raja expresses his love to Subhadra, she becomes angry and rejects his proposal. Though she actually likes him, due to her family situation and mother's instructions to avoid men, she shows no feelings for him. Upset, Raja declares he will never speak to her about his love again; he confidently states that she will come to express her love for him one day. Their silent love continues within themselves.

Raja eventually falls ill due to liver jaundice and does not attend college. When Lavanya visits him, she learns of his deep love for Subhadra and the suffering he is going through. Lavanya meets Subhadra and shouts at her cowardice to express her love to Raja. The academic year ends. Subhadra's mother learns about Subhadra's love and insults her. Subhadra now decides to meet Raja to express her love as she no longer wishes to hide it. Though his health has worsened, Raja comes with Moorthy by train to college to recollect their college days. Subhadra sees Raja seated in the train and expresses her love, but is devastated upon learning that he is already dead.

Cast 
 Shankar as Raja
 Roopa as Subhadra
Raveendar as Madhu
 Chandrasekhar as Moorthy
 Kailashnath as Thambu
 Kumari Usha as Lavanya
 Thyagu as Kannan
 Rajendar as a Hindi-singing student (cameo appearance)

Production 

The film was entirely shot at AVC college in Mayiladuthurai where Rajendar was an alumnus. The film marked the acting debuts of Shankar, Roopa, Thyagu and Ravindran. Cinematography was handled by the duo Robert–Rajasekar. Though Kailashnath was not very fluent in Tamil, he dubbed in his own voice.

The film marked the debut of Rajendar in the film industry. The producer E. M. Ibrahim of Mansoor Creations agreed to produce the film on the basis of one condition that Ibrahim himself will be credited as director while Rajender would be credited as the film's screenwriter and music composer. During the shoot, since Ibrahim had no prior experience of film direction, Rajender shot the whole film.

Soundtrack 
The music was composed by Rajendar, who also wrote the lyrics. Since the lead characters hardly speak to each other throughout the film, Archana Nathan, writing for Scroll.in, feels the songs are their way of communicating. Rajender said he wrote the song "Idhu Kuzhandhai Paadum" with the intention of defying the rules of grammar and "mak[ing] a distinctive mark" in his debut film. The songs became successful and made Rajendar popular as a composer. Rajender recalled that though he had composed the score, his name was not credited for that; the score he composed was replaced with that composed by A. A. Raj. This made Rajendar swear not to watch the film again.

Release and reception 

Oru Thalai Ragam was released on 2 May 1980. Ibrahim had to release the film himself after distributors refused due to the high price Ibrahim quoted for distribution territories. Ananda Vikatan rated the film 50 out of 100. The film completed 365 days of run in several theatres. Initial days after the release saw low responses at the box office. But the film eventually picked up and became a success.

Legacy 
Oru Thalai Ragams success led to more films in Tamil based on the theme of one-sided and unexpressed love. Shankar, for a while, became popularly known as "Oru Thalai Ragam Shankar" after the film's release. The film was remade in Telugu as Panchadara Chilaka (1999). Film historian S. Theodore Baskaran felt that Oru Thalai Ragam and Nammavar (1994) were the "two most representative Tamil films about students".

Notes

References

Bibliography

External links 
 
 

1980 directorial debut films
1980 films
1980s romantic musical films
1980s Tamil-language films
Films set in universities and colleges
Indian romantic musical films
Tamil films remade in other languages